Fowley is a surname. Notable people with the surname include:

People
 Douglas Fowley (1911–1998), American actor
 Kim Fowley (1939–2015), American record producer, singer, songwriter and musician
 Nicole Fowley, an Irish rugby player

Characters
Diana Fowley, a character from The X-files